Mount Brown is located in the Lewis Range, Glacier National Park in the U.S. state of Montana.

There are conflicting claims about who Mount Brown was named after.  A US Park Service publication states it was: "named for William Brown of Chicago, then Solicitor General for the Chicago and Alton Railroad, by some members of his party on a camping and fishing trip to the area around Lake McDonald in 1894. The companions, Charles H. Russell (not the artist) and Frank A. Johnson, climbed this mountain that arose back of their camp, and so named it."  However this naming story does not explain how the campers were able make their naming decision known to the public. The 1929 US Geographic Board decision card states that the Board accepted the name Mount Brown in accordance with existing local usage, and states that it was probably named for Louis Brown, a Montana pioneer.

Below the summit on the southwestern slopes of Mount Brown is the historic Mount Brown Fire Lookout which was built in 1928 and is listed on the National Register of Historic Places..

See also
 Mountains and mountain ranges of Glacier National Park (U.S.)

References

Mountains of Flathead County, Montana
Mountains of Glacier National Park (U.S.)
Lewis Range
Mountains of Montana